Results from Norwegian football in 1952.

1951–52 league season

Hovedserien

Group A

Group B

Championship final
June 22: Fredrikstad - Brann 3-1

Landsdelsserien

Group Østland/Søndre, A

Group Østland/Søndre, B

Group Sørland/Vestland, A1

Group Sørland/Vestland, A2

Group Sørland/Vestland B

Group Møre

Group Trøndelag

Promotion play-offs

Sørland/Vestland
Ålgård - Flekkefjord 2-0

Varegg - Ålgård 2-2 (extra time)

Varegg - Ålgård 2-1

Varegg promoted.

Møre/Trøndelag
Ranheim - Hødd 2-0

Ranheim promoted.

First Division

District I
 1. Moss (Promoted)
 2. Greåker
 3. Sprint
 4. Rakkestad
 5. Asim
 6. Rapid
 7. Borgen
 8. Tistedalen

District II, Group A
 1. Jevnaker (Play-off)
 2. Aurskog
 3. Nydalen
 4. Bjørkelangen
 5. Saene
 6. Mercantile/Trygg
 7. Akdemisk
 8. Bækkelaget

District II, Group B
 1. Drammens BK (Play-off)
 2. Kongsberg
 3. Kjelsås
 4. Mjøndalen
 5. Aaen
 6. Grei
 7. Strong
 8. Jordal

District III
 1. Hamarkameratene (Play-off)
 2. Raufoss
 3. Hamar IL
 4. Vang
 5. Fremad
 6. Mesna
 7. Brumunddal
 8. Bøverbru

District IV, Group A
 1. Herkules (Play-off)
 2. Storm
 3. Urædd
 4. Tønsberg Turn
 5. Flint
 6. Falk
 7. Tollnes
 8. Holmestrand

District IV, group B
 1. Skiens BK Play-off
 2. Rjukan
 3. Borg
 4. Brevik
 5. Skiens-Grane
 6. Ulefoss
 7. Sp.klubben 31
 8. Langesund

District V, Group A1 (Aust-Agder)
 1. Trauma (Play-off)
 2. Arendals BK
 3. Risør
 4. Nedenes
 5. Nidarås
 6. Tvedestrand

District V, Group A2 (Aust-Agder)
 1. Vindbjart (Play-off)
 2. AIK Lund
 3. Bakke
 4. Vigør
 5. Farsund
 6. Torridal

District V, Group B1 (Rogaland)
 1. Klepp (Promoted)
 2. Varhaug
 3. Brodd
 4. Orre
 5. Pol
 6. Ganddal

District V, B2 (Rogaland)
 1. Stavanger IF (Promoted)
 2. Haugar
 3. Buøy
 4. Vidar
 5. Kopervik
 6. Staal

District VI, Group A (Bergen)
 1. Fjellkameratene (Play-off)
 2. Laksevåg
 3. Minde
 4. Bergens-Sparta
 5. Trane
 6. Frøya
 7. Viggo

District VI, Group B (Midthordland)
 1. Voss (Play-off)
 2. Florvåg
 3. Dale (Dalekvam)
 4. Fana
 5. Erdal

District VII, Group A (Sunnmøre/Romsdal)
 1. Ørsta (Promoted)
 2. Spjelkavik
 3. Skarbøvik
 4. Veblungsnes
 5. Volda
 6. Åndalsnes
 7. Aksla
 8. Hareid

District VII, Group B (Nordmøre/Romsdal)
 1. Træff (Promoted)
 2. Nordlandet
 3. Averøykam.
 4. Halsa
 5. Goma
 6. Sunndal
 7. Bjørn
 8. Rensvik

District VIII, Group A (Sør-Trøndelag)
 1. Løkken (Play-off)
 2. Melhus
 3. Svorkmo
 4. Troll
 5. Orkanger
 6. Heimdal
 7. Oppdal

District VIII, Group B (Trondheim og omegn)
 1. National (Play-off)
 2. Nidar
 3. Tryggkameratene
 4. Ørn (Trondheim)
 5. Trond
 6. Tempe
 7. Vestbyen
 8. Strindheim

District VIII, Group C (Fosen)
 1. Opphaug (Play-off)
 2. Beian
 3. Lensvik
 4. Uthaug
 5. Stadsbygd
 6. Fevåg
 7. Brekstad

District VIII, Group D (Nord-Trøndelag)
 1. Nessegutten (Play-off)
 2. Sverre
 3. Stjørdal
 4. Verdal
 5. Malm
 6. Blink
 7. Frostakameratene

Play-off, District II/III
Jevnaker - Drammens BK 2-1

Drammens BK - Hamarkameratene 0-1

Hamarkameratene - Jevnaker 3-4

Table

Championship District II
Jevnaker - Drammens BK 2-1

Drammens BK - Jevnaker 0-2 (agg. 1-4)

Play-off District IV
Herkules - Skiens BK 2-0

Herkules promoted.

Relegation play-off District IV
Falk - Ulefoss 1-1 (extra time)

Falk - Ulefoss 0-1 (in Porsgrunn)

Falk relegated

Play-off District V
Trauma - Vindbjart 4-0

Vindbjart - Trauma 1-1 (agg. 1-5)

Trauma promoted.

Championship District V
Stavanger IF - Klepp 5–1

Klepp - Stavanger IF 0-3 (agg. 1-8)

Trauma - Stavanger IF 0-2 (in Flekkefjord)

Play-off District VI
Fjellkameratene - Voss 1-2

Voss - Fjellkameratene 3-2 (agg. 5-3)

Voss promoted.

Championship District VII
Ørsta - Træff 6-1 (in Ålesund)

Play-off District VIII
Løkken - Opphaug 7-2

Nessegutten - Løkken 5-3

Opphaug - National 0-6

National - Nessegutten 1-3

National - Løkken 1-0

Nessegutten - Opphaug 10-2

Table

Norwegian Cup

Final

Northern Norwegian Cup

Final

National team

Note: Norway's goals first 
Explanation:
OG = 1952 Summer Olympics

References

  
Seasons in Norwegian football